Jacqueline Samuda is a Canadian actress, director and writer.

Biography
Samuda was born in Ottawa, Ontario, and grew up in both the United States and Canada. She received a B.F.A. Degree in Performance from York University in Toronto, and apprenticed at the prestigious Shaw Festival in Niagara-on-the Lake, Ontario. An experienced film/TV/stage/voice actress, Jacqueline has appeared in recurring roles on TV's Spooksville, The L Word and the epic sci-fi series Stargate SG-1 and in many other feature film, TV episodic and animation projects. She is a busy voiceover performer who has voiced many international and national commercial campaigns and many other projects, from audiobooks to videogames to corporate and documentary film. She was a finalist for the 2008 VOICEY Awards, an international voiceover award. As a writer/director, Jacqueline was honoured with the inaugural prize of the Motion Picture Producers Association/Women in the Directors' Chair Feature Film Award in 2008. A past BC Film Writer’s Fellow and instructor at Vancouver Film School and UBC’s Writing Centre, she also has story edited and polished many screenplays, including The Delicate Art of Parking and The Foursome. Her directing background spans theatre in Toronto and L.A. (garnering a Best Director L.A. Critics’ Award for Zastrozzi), and seven short films (received awards, screenings at film festivals and TV distribution). She has taught Directing Actors as a Guest Artist at University of Los Angeles. She has served as president of the board of directors for Pacific Cinématheque, Vancouver’s non-profit cultural cinema venue. Jacqueline has been active on the board of Vancouver's Women in Film, where she served as president of the board 2001-2003 and on the advisory board in subsequent years. In 2008, Jacqueline was honoured to receive a Lifetime Member Award for her work with Women in Film.

Filmography

Film

Television

Video games

References

External links
 
 Official site
 GateWorld.net: Nirrti on the Couch

Living people
Actresses from Ottawa
York University alumni
Canadian film actresses
Canadian television actresses
Canadian voice actresses
1963 births